Gail Brodsky (born June 5, 1991) is an American former professional tennis player.

Her career-high WTA singles ranking is 182, reached on March 19, 2012. On May 2, 2011, she peaked at No. 348 in the doubles rankings. On the ITF Circuit, she has won six singles titles and two doubles titles. She won the 2008 USTA Girls’ 18s national title.

Career
Brodsky was born in Zaporizhia, Ukraine, to Eduard and Julia, moved to Ocean Parkway across the street from Coney Island Hospital in Brighton Beach, Brooklyn, when she was six, and is Jewish. As a youth, she trained on public courts in Manhattan Beach, Brooklyn. She and her husband and two children live in Kirkland, Washington.

She won the 2008 USTA Girls’ 18s national title, defeating Sloane Stephens, the 2017 US Open champion, and CoCo Vandeweghe, the 2017 US Open semifinalist, at 17 years of age. She thus earned a wild card to the 2008 US Open, where she lost in the first round, 5–7, 3–6, to world No. 14, Agnes Szavay. She was also given a wildcard into the 2009 US Open, where she lost in the first round 4–6, 4–6 to Anabel Medina Garrigues.

She said: “I grew up with a lot of pressure and not a lot of passion for the sport.” Her parents were strict about her diet and other aspects of her life; it was only after she broke all contact with them (she says: “it wasn’t a healthy situation”), at age 17, that she tasted her first French fry.

In 2007 and 2010, she won the Ojai Tennis Tournament in women's singles. She also won the 2010 $10k Porto, 2011 $10k Gosier and $25k La Coruna, 2015 $10k Victoria, and 2018 $15k Victoria and $60k Ashland singles titles.

She has also won the 2010 Landisville (w/A. Mueller) and the 2018 Victoria (w/B. Boren) doubles titles.

ITF Circuit finals

Singles: 9 (6 titles, 3 runner-ups)

Doubles: 4 (2–2)

See also
List of notable Jewish tennis players

References

External links
 
 
 
 

Living people
1991 births
American female tennis players
Jewish American sportspeople
Jewish tennis players
American people of Ukrainian-Jewish descent
Sportspeople from Zaporizhzhia
People from Brighton Beach
Sportspeople from Kirkland, Washington
Tennis people from New York (state)
21st-century American Jews
21st-century American women